Gražvydas is a Lithuanian masculine given name. Individuals with the name Gražvydas include:
Gražvydas Lukinavičius (born 1978), Lithuanian biochemist
Gražvydas Mikulėnas (born 1973), Lithuanian footballer

References

Lithuanian masculine given names